Yes, Mr Brown is a 1933 British musical comedy film directed by Herbert Wilcox and starring Jack Buchanan, Hartley Power, Elsie Randolph and Margot Grahame. According to the Idaho Falls Post Register, the film was "gay catchy...entertainment with plenty of light comedy", in which "the manager of the Viennese branch of a large American toy firm [played by Buchanan] sets out to entertain his visiting boss [played by Power] in an effort to win a partnership." Yes, Mr. Brown is currently missing from the BFI National Archive, and is listed as one of the British Film Institute's "75 Most Wanted" lost films.

Cast
 Jack Buchanan as Nicholas Baumann
 Hartley Power as Mr Brown
 Elsie Randolph as Anne Weber
 Margot Grahame as Clary Baumann
 Vera Pearce as Franzi
 Clifford Heatherley as Carlos
 David Bane as Head waiter
 Muriel George as Cook

Other film versions
 A Bit of Love (March 1932, Germany, directed by Max Neufeld)
 Monsieur, Madame and Bibi (March 1932, France, directed by Max Neufeld and Jean Boyer)
 Two Happy Hearts (September 1932, Italy, directed by Baldassarre Negroni)

References

External links
 BFI 75 Most Wanted entry, with extensive notes
 

1933 films
1933 musical comedy films
British musical comedy films
1930s English-language films
British films based on plays
Films directed by Herbert Wilcox
Films set in Vienna
Lost British films
British remakes of German films
British black-and-white films
British and Dominions Studios films
Films shot at Imperial Studios, Elstree
1933 lost films
1930s British films